Owl Labs is a company that makes 360° video conferencing devices called the "Meeting Owl" and the "Meeting Owl Pro". It was founded in 2014 by robotics experts Max Makeev and Mark Schnittman. It raised a total of $7.3M in venture capital from seed and Series A rounds led by serial entrepreneur Andy Rubin (via his Playground Global fund), Antonio Rodriguez (general partner at Matrix Partners) and iRobot Ventures. In June 2017, it announced its Meeting Owl device. VentureBeat noted that unlike others Meeting Owl has "...a single 360-degree camera that can recognize and highlight the person speaking..." The device contains a Qualcomm Snapdragon. 

Owl Labs was recognized by the New England Venture Capital Association with a NEVY Award for "Hottest Tech Startup".

References

External links  

Privately held companies of the United States
Video compression